Matthew Robert Young (born 26 January 1994) is an English footballer who last played as a defender for National League South club Hampton & Richmond Borough.

Club career
After a spell as a youngster at Tottenham Hotspur, which spanned from the ages of 10–16, Young signed scholarship forms at Southampton at aged 16, and signed his first professional contract for Southampton in May 2012.

Failing to break into the first team, he left Southampton in the summer of 2014 to join Sheffield Wednesday. He signed a one-year contract with Sheffield Wednesday on 3 June 2014. On 10 January 2015, he signed for Carlisle United on a one-month loan deal. He made his Football League debut later that day in a 1–0 loss to Cambridge United. Three games into his loan spell, he extended his stay at Carlisle United  for the rest of the season. He made twenty appearances, all of which came as starts, for the League Two side. After his loan spell ended in May 2015, he was one of eleven players to leave Sheffield Wednesday.

In July 2015, Young spent pre season with National League club Barrow. Following his short spell at Barrow, he signed for fellow National League club Dover Athletic on 7 August 2015. His first appearance for the club came from off the bench in the first game of the season in a 2–1 defeat against Barrow.

Young signed for Kidderminster Harriers in October 2015 on a deal until the end of the year. He made 10 first team appearances, including a game winning assist in a home game versus Woking which ended the Harriers wretched run of form. He went on to join Isthmian League Premier Division club Billericay Town at the start of the 2016–17 season, making six appearances before departing in September to go on trial with League Two club Exeter City.

On 30 September 2016, Young joined Chelmsford City. He left the club again at the end of the season.

On 3 August 2017, Young joined Woking two days before the season was due to start. On 15 August 2017, Young made his Woking debut during their 2–1 home victory over Eastleigh, replacing Louis Ramsay in the 89th minute. On 28 August 2017, Young replaced Norwich City loanee, Louis Ramsay in the starting lineup to make his first start for the Cards during their impressive 4–1 home victory against Torquay United. On 12 December 2017, Young scored his first Woking goal in their FA Cup second round tie against Peterborough United, netting the Cards' second equaliser of the game in the 5–2 defeat.

On 28 July 2018, following a pre-season trial Crawley Town, Young opted to return to Chelmsford City on a one-year deal. On 9 May 2019, Young left Chelmsford City.

On 6 September 2019, Young signed for Hampton & Richmond Borough.

Career statistics

References

External links

1994 births
Living people
Association football defenders
Charlton Athletic F.C. players
Tottenham Hotspur F.C. players
Southampton F.C. players
Sheffield Wednesday F.C. players
Carlisle United F.C. players
Dover Athletic F.C. players
Kidderminster Harriers F.C. players
Billericay Town F.C. players
Welling United F.C. players
Chelmsford City F.C. players
Woking F.C. players
Hampton & Richmond Borough F.C. players
English Football League players
National League (English football) players
Isthmian League players
English footballers